OhnagamiDam is a gravity dam located in Shimane Prefecture in Japan. The dam is used for flood control and water supply. The catchment area of the dam is 106.2 km2. The dam impounds about 90  ha of land when full and can store 19270 thousand cubic meters of water. The construction of the dam was started on 1974 and completed in 2003.

References

Dams in Shimane Prefecture
2003 establishments in Japan